Joanna McGrenere is a Canadian computer scientist specializing in human–computer interaction, adaptive user interfaces, and universal usability. She is a professor of computer science at the University of British Columbia.

Education
McGrenere earned a Bachelor of Science degree in computer science University of Western Ontario in 1993. She earned a master's degree in 1996 at the University of British Columbia and completing her Ph.D. in 2002 at the University of Toronto. Her dissertation, The Design and Evaluation of Multiple Interfaces: A Solution for Complex Software, was jointly supervised by Ronald Baecker and Kellogg S. Booth.

Career 
After earning her bachelor's degree, McGrenere briefly worked at IBM. Upon completing her doctorate, she joined the University of British Columbia as an assistant professor in 2002. She was promoted to full professor in 2013.
At the University of British Columbia, her notable doctoral students have included Leah Findlater and Karyn Moffat.

In 2004, McGrenere became the inaugural winner of the Borg Early Career Award of the Computing Research Association.
In 2011, the Canadian Association of Computer Science gave McGrenere their Outstanding Young Computer Science Researcher Award.
McGrenere was elected to the College of New Scholars, Artists and Scientists of the Royal Society of Canada in 2017.

References

External links
Home page

Year of birth missing (living people)
Living people
Canadian women computer scientists
Canadian computer scientists
Human–computer interaction researchers
University of Western Ontario alumni
University of British Columbia alumni
University of Toronto alumni
Academic staff of the University of British Columbia